A Balliol rhyme is a doggerel verse form with a distinctive metre. It is a quatrain, having two pairs of rhyming couplets (rhyme scheme AABB), each line having four beats. They are written in the voice of the named subject and elaborate on that person's character, exploits or predilections.

The form is associated with, and takes its name from, Balliol College, Oxford.

Origins
In 1880, seven undergraduates of Balliol published 40 quatrains of doggerel lampooning various members of the college under the title The Masque of B–ll––l, now better known as The Balliol Masque, in a format that came to be called the "Balliol rhyme". The college authorities suppressed the publication fiercely. The verses were inspired by the conventions of traditional mummers' plays (at their peak of popularity in the late 19th century), in which the dialogue took the form of simple verses, and in which characters introduced themselves on first entrance with some such formula as: "Here comes I a Turkish Knight / Come from the Turkish land to fight".

Examples
About Benjamin Jowett, Master of Balliol (from The Masque of B-ll--l):

About George Nathaniel Curzon:

About John William Mackail:

See also
 Clerihew

References

Bibliography

External links
Representative Poetry Online: "The Masque of B–ll––l"

Balliol College, Oxford
Poetic forms
Rhyme